James Jordan (born 13 April 1978) is an English ballroom dancer and choreographer. His dance partner is his wife Ola Jordan, with whom he turned professional in 2000. Jordan appeared as a professional on Strictly Come Dancing from 2006 to 2013. In August 2014, he participated in the fourteenth series of Celebrity Big Brother. He finished in third place. He returned as an All-Star for the nineteenth series, where he was evicted in thirteenth place.

In 2018 he appeared along with his wife, Ola, on Comedy Central's Your Face or Mine?. On 10 March 2019, Jordan won the eleventh series of Dancing on Ice, where he was partnered with professional Finnish figure skater Alexandra Schauman.

Dancing career
Jordan was born in Gillingham, Kent, and attended St John Fisher Catholic School in Chatham. He started dancing at the age of 13. He now dances with his wife, Ola. Ola previously danced with Przemek Lowicki in Poland; James previously danced with Agnieszka Melnicka, but they split in 1999. He also danced with Kate Pothecary (1996) and Elisabeth Haraldsdottir (October 1997 – December 1997).

James and Ola's first recorded dance as a partnership was in the Dutch Open in 2000, though they did not turn professional until 2003. The couple retired for a while, in favour of teaching Latin American dancing in Hong Kong, though they returned to competition later.

In May 2006, the couple came second in the Blackpool Professional Rising Stars Latin event, and in November they came third in the British Championship, Professional Latin. In 2010, he was a choreographer in So You Think You Can Dance.  they live near Maidstone in Kent, close to his family who live on St Mary's Island, Medway.

Strictly Come Dancing

Highest and lowest scoring performances per dance

Series 4 (2006)

In his first series as a Strictly professional, Jordan partnered Casualty actress Georgina Bouzova.

 Series average for Georgina and James: 19.3

Series 5 (2007)

In the fifth series of Strictly, Jordan was partnered by BBC Sport presenter Gabby Logan, whose rugby union player husband Kenny Logan was partnered by Ola Jordan. This was the first time two married couples had competed against each other. Gabby and James were voted out in Week 4 of the competition, as he did in the previous series. Kenny and Ola were voted out in Week 9 (ending up in 5th place).

 Series average for Gabby and James: 30.0

Series 6 (2008)

In the sixth series of Strictly Come Dancing, James Jordan danced with actress Cherie Lunghi, while Ola's partner was the GMTV presenter Andrew Castle. After having exited so early in his previous series, James was concerned he was under a "four-week curse", which was then broken. He and Lunghi were voted off in Week 9, in a dance-off against Lisa Snowdon and her partner Brendan Cole. In January–February 2009, Jordan also danced with Lunghi on the Strictly Come Dancing Tour 2009.

 Series average for Cherie and James: 32.4

Series 7 (2009)

In series 7, he was partnered by actress Zöe Lucker but they were eliminated in week 7. Jordan stated that "winning that trophy is my dream but I wouldn't give up this wonderful lady for that ball." Eventually, wife Ola won the competition that year, partnered with presenter Chris Hollins.

 Series average for Zoe and James: 31.4

Series 8 (2010)

In the 2010 series, Jordan was partnered with comedian and psychologist Dr. Pamela Stephenson. Despite competing at the age of 61, Pamela quickly defied all odds by topping the judges' leaderboard for the first three weeks of the competition, and for six weeks in total, a record for the series. In week 10, their Viennese Waltz received the first ever perfect 40 from the judges for the series. The pair made it to the Strictly final, and despite never being in the bottom two even once before and were the highest-scoring couple throughout the evening, they eventually finished in third place behind actress Kara Tointon and presenter and former gymnast Matt Baker. Pamela and James collected three perfect scores from the judges throughout the series, a record at the time they shared with Lisa Snowdon and Brendan Cole in series 6.

Series average: 35.1
Bold scores indicate the occasion where their dances were the highest-scoring dances of the respective weeks.

Series 9 (2011)

The One Show presenter Alex Jones was James Jordan's partner in the 2011 series. Jordan and judge Craig Revel Horwood were involved in a minor feud, as a 6 for Jones' Charleston in week 9 caused the couple to flutter down the leaderboard, as opposed to their top position the week before. The tough score outraged the professional dancer as he reportedly stormed out of the studio fuming, feeling the score to be undeserved and personal against James. Horwood further defended his judgement by claiming himself to be "tougher" as the competition goes. This feud was further reiterated when Horwood dropped James and Ola Jordan from the Strictly tour later in the year. Alex Jones reached the semi-final, eventually coming fifth in the competition.

Jennifer Grey, the winner of the eleventh series of Dancing with the Stars, the American version of 'Strictly', was a guest judge, replacing Len Goodman while he had a week off.

 Series average for Alex and James: 30.3

Series 10 (2012)

For its tenth series in September 2012, Jordan was partners with television presenter, actress and singer Denise van Outen. Surpassing his feat with Pamela Stephenson, he secured the top position of the leaderboard 7 times with Denise, including 4 consecutive top positions. For the second time ever, he reached the final but placed his best in the competition overall, with Outen and Jordan finishing as runners-up with singer Kimberley Walsh and her partner Pasha Kovalev, behind the winners gymnast Louis Smith and professional partner Flavia Cacace.

 Series average for Denise and James: 35.1

Series 11 (2013)
On 7 September 2013, Strictly Come Dancing  Jordan was partnered with Vanessa Feltz. The pair were eliminated in the third round.

Other television appearances

Jordan, together with Ola, took part in a celebrity version of television programme Total Wipeout which was broadcast on 26 December 2009. In 2013, Jordan took place in a celebrity version of Splash! for ITV's Text Santa.

In August 2014, James took part in fourteenth series of Celebrity Big Brother. He entered the house on Day 1 and finished third on the final night. Since 2014, Jordan has regularly appeared as a panellist on The Wright Stuff.

Jordan and wife Ola appeared on Through the Keyhole in September 2015, with host Keith Lemon.

Jordan starred in Celebrity Big Brother 19 as an "all star" housemate. He was the fourth celebrity to be evicted from the Celebrity Big Brother House.

In 2019, Jordan participated in the eleventh series of Dancing on Ice, alongside professional partner Alexandra Schauman. After receiving the most votes, Jordan and Schauman were crowned the winners of the series.

He also appeared on the fourth series of Celebrity Coach Trip, alongside wife Ola.

Filmography

References

External links
 
 
James Jordan Biogs.com profile

1978 births
Living people
British ballroom dancers
English male dancers
Place of birth missing (living people)